Vikram Bhatt (born 27 January 1969) is an Indian director, producer, screenwriter and actor. He is best known for directing the Raaz film series, an Indian horror series produced by Mahesh Bhatt and Mukesh Bhatt and for directing Ghulam (1999) starring Aamir Khan and Rani Mukherji, which was also produced by Mukesh Bhatt. For both of these he was nominated for the Filmfare Award for Best Director.

Formerly, he was the creative head of ASA Productions and Enterprises until 2014, when he resigned from the company.

Early life
Bhatt is the grandson of Vijay Bhatt from (Gujarat, Palitana), one of the pioneers of the Indian film industry, and the son of cinematographer Pravin Bhatt.

Career
At the age of 14, in 1982, Bhatt started his career with director Mukul Anand in Anand's first film, Kanoon Kya Karega. Bhatt also assisted Mukul Anand as the chief assistant on the sets of Agneepath. This film turned out to be a cult classic, though not very successful at the box office.

Subsequently, Bhatt worked with director Shekhar Kapur for two and a half years and later with director Mahesh Bhatt for two years approximately. He has been an assistant director on the sets of several successful films including Hum Hain Rahi Pyar Ke and Junoon.

His career as a director began with the film Jaanam, which was produced by Mukesh Bhatt. His first four films did not fare well at the box office; his first successful directorial venture was Fareb. Following this, he had a string of successful films such as Ghulam, Kasoor, Raaz and Awara Paagal Deewana. After Awara Paagal Deewana , He gave flops like Aap Mujhe Achche Lagne Lage, Deewane Huye Paagal and Ankahee.
In 2008, Bhatt came back with the horror genre and he delivered three films that were successful at the box office; these include 1920. Shaapit and Haunted – 3D. In 2010, Bhatt introduced stereoscopic 3D for the first time in India with his film Haunted – 3D; the film was released in May 2011 and it then set the record of the highest grossing Hindi horror film of all time, making Rs. 270 million at the box office.

In 2012, Bhatt's Raaz 3D recorded domestic box office collection of 729 million after the 3rd weekend and the overseas collection was at 46 million. Riding high with the success, Bhatt is writing another horror-thriller for Bipasha in the central role, with a more shocking image than Raaz 3. Following the success of Raaz 3, Vikram Bhatt's written Hindi horror movie 1920: Evil Returns which has been directed by debutant Bhushan Patel topped the first weekend collection chart at the box office and the approximate collection was Rs 124.3 million nett. The movie further collected approx Rs 37.5 million nett in the second Weekend, taking the total to Rs 228.6 million nett. The film has been declared a 'Hit'. Soon after, Bhatt signed a deal with Bhushan Kumar's T-Series to produce 5 films of sci-fi, thriller and horror genre. Two of the films will be directed by Bhatt himself.

In early 2013, Bhatt announced his upcoming projects, Creature 3D, India's First 3D Monster Movie with Bipasha Basu in the lead role and 1920 London, third in the 1920 series. Vikram Bhatt will mark his foray into Marathi cinema with 'Ek Doosrey Ke Liye', which will be directed by Ashwini Kumar Patil.

Starting from 16 February 2014, he would be seen hosting the TV Show Ishq Kills based on Real Life Romances on Star Plus.

Notable achievements
Bhatt's movies, 1920: Evil Returns's social media promotion campaign was studied by Indian Institute of Management Bangalore. The management institute assessed Internet activities and campaigns; the team finally establish the connection between box office collections and promotions on social media. This case study is published by Harvard Business Publishing and is being used by students in the US, Canada, Norway, Slovenia and Sri Lanka.

Bhatt's scripts for Khamoshiyan, 1920: Evil Returns and 1920 are set to turn into novels and release in January 2015.

Personal life
Bhatt was married to his childhood sweetheart, Aditi Bhatt (div. 1998), and they have a daughter, Krishna Bhatt. Bhatt shares a great bond with his daughter and she has been assisting him on his sets.

Bhatt reportedly dated Ameesha Patel for five years and had also reportedly dated Sushmita Sen sometime in the mid 1990s, after she became Miss Universe 1994. He married art connoisseur Shwetambari Soni in 2020.

Filmography

As a director

Writer
 Dastak (1996)
 Aetbaar (2004)
 Bardaasht (2004)
 Yakeen (2005)
 Ankahee (2006)
 Three- Love, Lies and Betrayal (2009)
 Hate Story (2012)
 1920: Evil Returns (2012)
 Ankur Arora Murder Case (2013)
 Khamoshiyan (2015)
 1920 London (2016)
 Ghost (2019)

Producer
Muthirai (2009)
1920 (2008)
Three- Love, Lies and Betrayal (2009)
Lanka (2011)
Hate Story (2012)
1920: Evil Returns (2012)
Dangerous Ishq (2012)
Horror Story (2013)
Hate Story 2 (2014)
Bhaag Johnny (2014)
Hate Story 3 (2015)
1920 Horrors of the heart (2022)

Actor

References

External links 

 vikram,bhatt-biography[हिंदी]

1969 births
Living people
Hindi film producers
Indian male screenwriters
Hindi-language film directors
Vikram
20th-century Indian film directors
Film directors from Mumbai
Film producers from Mumbai
21st-century Indian film directors
Hindi screenwriters
20th-century Indian dramatists and playwrights
21st-century Indian dramatists and playwrights
Screenwriters from Mumbai
20th-century Indian male writers
21st-century Indian male writers